Green Grows the Vine (1960) is a novel by Australian writer Nancy Cato.

Story outline
The novel follows the story of three women - Mandy, Mitch and Maria - who travel from Adelaide to pick grapes in the fictional South Australian wine-growing district of Vindura. All are escaping disappointments - death and broken relationships - and the time spent in the country offers them all a chance of renewal.

Critical reception
A short review in The Canberra Times described the novel as "Another pleasantly earthy though quite undistinguished love story."

Notes
 First written as 'The Budding Leaf' (unpublished). Cato threw this first version into the Thames while she was in London, and later re-wrote it.

See also
 1960 in Australian literature

References

1960 Australian novels
Novels set in South Australia